Events in the year 1903 in Iceland.

Incumbents 
 Monarch: Christian IX
 Minister for Iceland: Peter Adler Alberti

Events 

 22 February – The Fríkirkjan í Reykjavík is consecrated in Reykjavik.
 Íþróttabandalag Vestmannaeyja, along with the ÍBV men's football team is established in Vestmannaeyjar.

References 

 
1900s in Iceland
Years of the 20th century in Iceland
Iceland
Iceland